La Loma is an unincorporated community located in Santa Fe County, New Mexico, United States. La Loma had its own post office from March 24, 1942, to September 10, 2011; it still has its own ZIP code, 87724.

References

Unincorporated communities in Santa Fe County, New Mexico
Unincorporated communities in New Mexico